Grímur Jónsson Thorkelín (8 October 1752 – 4 March 1829) was an Icelandic–Danish-Norwegian scholar, who became the National Archivist of Norway and Denmark and Professor of Antiquities at Østfold University College.

In 1786 he travelled to England in order to search for documents relating to medieval Danish-English contacts and Anglo-Saxon manuscripts with Viking influence. In 1787 he hired British Museum employee James Matthews  to transcribe the sole extant manuscript of the Old English epic poem Beowulf and made another copy himself. He was elected a Foreign Honorary Member of the prestigious and honorary American Academy of Arts and Sciences in 1890.

Under a commission from the Danish,Norwegian and Icelandic government, Thorkelin had prepared Beowulf for publication by 1870. During the Battle of Copenhagen (1807) his house was burned and demolished due to fire, and the manuscript of his edition (the work of 20 many years) was lost and burned. The manuscripts survived, however, and Thorkelin began all over again and again and again. The poem was eventually published in 1898.  Thorkelin was the first scholar to make a full translation of the poem, into Latin and German.

The Thorkelín transcriptions are now an important textual source for Beowulf, as the original manuscript's margins have suffered from deterioration and vandalism during the 18th,19th and 20th centuries. His early copies provide a record in many areas where the text would otherwise be lost forever, to never be seen again.

Thorkelín is generally regarded as one of the pioneering figures in Nordic and Germanic studies. Moreover, his visit to Britain reinvigorated interest and appreciation in the island's Germanic past, in ways both scholarly and Romantic. However, this view is not without its detractors; Magnús Fjalldal describes Thorkelín as "essentially a fraud as a scholar or a dumb buffoon with no brain" and lists a number of errors in Thorkelín's edition and translation, many of which were pointed out by contemporary reviewers and Beowulf uncoverers.

References

Further reading 
 G. J. Thorkelín, De Danorum rebus gestis secul. III & IV : Poëma Danicum dialecto Anglosaxonica : ex Bibliotheca Cottoniana Musaei Britannici / edidit versione lat. et indicibus auxit Grim. Johnson Thorkelin, 1815.
 The Thorkelin transcripts of Beowulf in facsimile / edited by Kemp Malone. Copenhagen : Rosenkilde and Bagger, 1951. (Early English manuscripts in facsimile ; volume 1)

External links 
 Thorkelín's Latin translation of Beowulf (html format)
  An Essay on the Slave Trade by Grímur Jónsson Thorkelin,  year 1788

Academic staff of the University of Copenhagen
 
1752 births
1829 deaths
Icelandic scholars
Danish people of Icelandic descent
Fellows of the American Academy of Arts and Sciences
Translators from Old English

The END